Gastón Zvi Ickowicz (born 1974, Buenos Aires) is an Israeli visual artist living and working in Tel Aviv.

Biography 
Gaston Ickowicz immigrated to Israel from Argentina in 1980 at the age of 6. He studied photography at Naggar School of Photography, Media, New Music, Visual Communication and Phototherapy in Musrara, Jerusalem from 1997 till 2000. Ickowicz received MFA in art and photography from Bezalel School of Arts and Design in 2008. Ickowicz works are in permanent collections of Tel Aviv Museum of Art, Haifa Museum of Art, Museum on the Seam in Jerusalem, Ashdod Art Museum and private collections.

Work 
Ickowicz mainly works in video and photography and centers on the interaction between people and landscape in a socio-political context. His work entertains a dialogue with the Israeli sphere and touches some of the conflicts it contains.
 

The difference between "landscape" and "place" is one of Ickowics's main subjects.
His work examines the relations between these two concepts, as well as their potential to change following their definition as such and the perspective from which they are viewed.

He is interested in how the photographic act can transform a landscape, which may only be examined as a static image, into a place with a dynamic quality, an act that enables him to study various components of the landscapes identity.
 
Ickowicz captures sights and traces that remain in the aftermath of various events; a spent bonfire, a scorched field burnt in the course of a military bombing, an avalanche in the desert, rocks used to create a roadblock, or the ruins of an ancient settlement.
This strategy documents the traces of different processes and events that took place in the past, and is directed at exploring definitions of memory, history, and culture as they are revealed through the signs captured by the camera.

The journeys in which these images are taken are also related to a more general existential state, which involves a search for roots and for a sense of belonging. In this context, the concept of time is expanded: inevitably, the present, or "here-and-now" captured in these works, is viewed in relation to a chronological axis that constantly echoes the past.

Exhibitions

Solo
 2003 Buenos Aires – Good Air, Hagar Gallery, Jaffa
 2005 Chapters from a Settlement, Haifa Museum of Art
 2007 The Pale, Tavi Dresdner Gallery, Tel Aviv
 2008 The Pale, Habres & Partner Gallery, Vienna
 2010 Cubit, Span, Foot, Chelouche Gallery for Contemporary Art, Tel Aviv
 2011 "B.C.", Tel Aviv Museum of Art 
 2012 Untitled (Explosion), Department of Photographic Communication Gallery, Hadassah Academic College, Jerusalem
 2013 The Rock and the Stone, Bazel Gallery, Tel Aviv
 2015 "Everyday Ceremonies", Hezi Cohen Gallery, Tel Aviv 
 2016 "Nesting", Center for Contemporary Art, Tel Aviv
 2017 "The Earth is Heavy, and its Weight Pulls Downwards". "La Cite International des Arts", Paris.

Group 
2017

 Since the Breath of Primeval Time. Inga Gallery for Contemporary Art. Tel Aviv

2016

 VideoVideo: Video Art Festival, Burgundy, France
 Deads Lands, NurtureArt Gallery, New York
 Visions of Places, Center for the Arts Gallery, Towson University, Towson, Maryland

2014

 Double Exposure, Project #2, The Shpilman Institute for Photography, Tel Aviv
 Secular Judaism, Nahum Gutman Museum of Art, Tel Aviv

2013

 Collecting Dust in Contemporary Israeli Art, The Israel Museum, Jerusalem
 Vacatio, Fotografia: International Photography Festival, MACRO Museum of Contemporary Art, Rome
 Beyond No-Man's Land: Journey Across a Landscape of Identities, Andrea Meislin Gallery, New York

2012

 Another Place: Artists Respond to Outdoor Works by Itzhak Danziger, Dana Gallery, Yad Mordechai
 Teen Spirit / Musrara: A Social Manifesto, GRID 2012: International Photography Biennale, Amsterdam

2011

 Making Room: Contemporary Israeli Photography, Tel Aviv Museum of Art, Tel Aviv
 Southern Spirit, The Negev Museum of Art, Beersheba

2010

 Work in Progress, The Israel Museum, Jerusalem
 Comes with the Territory, Sommer Contemporary Art, Tel Aviv; Charim Ungar Contemporary, Berlin
 Grandfather Paradox, Chelouche Gallery for Contemporary Art, Tel Aviv

2009

 Neighbors, Chelouche Gallery for Contemporary Art, Tel Aviv
 Neues Sehen: Young Israeli Art, Syker Vorwerk Center for Contemporary Art, Germany; Dollinger Art Project, Tel Aviv

2008

 Contemporary Israeli Art: The Current Generation, Municipal Museum, Bremen, Germany
 Silverstein Photography Annual: Curatorial Nominees, Bruce Silverstein Gallery, New York
 Art of the State: Contemporary Photography and Video from Israel, Joods Historisch Museum, Amsterdam
 Real Time: Art in Israel 1998-2008, The Israel Museum, Jerusalem

2007

 Displacements, MoBY – David Ben-Ari Museum for Contemporary Art, Bat Yam
 Bare Life, Museum on the Seam, Jerusalem
 Engagement: Israeli Photography Now, The Israel Museum, Jerusalem

2006

 The Making of a City, Ashdod Art Museum, Ashdod
 Disengagement, Tel Aviv Museum of Art, Tel Aviv
 A Road to Nowhere, Ashdod Art Museum, Ashdod

2005

 Other Voices, Other Rooms, Le Ciminiere Exhibition Center, Catania, Sicily Puntos Cardinales, PS122, New York

2004

 Nazar: Noorderlicht Foundation Photofestival, Groningen, the Netherlands;

in 2005 traveled as Houston Fotofest to Houston, Texas; and the Gallery of Photography, Dublin, Ireland
Field of Depth, Latin Collector, New York

2003

 The Photography Biennale of Plovdiv, Bulgaria

Awards and scholarships 

2003	

 Artist-Teacher Scholarship, Ministry of Culture and Sport

2008	

 America-Israel Cultural Foundation Prize
 The Gérard Lévy Prize for a Young Photographer, The Israel Museum, Jerusalem

2010	

 Young Artist Award, Ministry of Culture and Sport

References

External links
Official website

1974 births
Living people
Argentine emigrants to Israel
Argentine Jews
Artists from Buenos Aires
Jewish Israeli artists
People from Tel Aviv
Bezalel Academy of Arts and Design alumni